Firuzabad (also Romanized as Fīrūzābād and Firooz Abad; also known as Hājīābād) is a village in Shusef Rural District, Shusef District, Nehbandan County, South Khorasan Province, Iran. At the 2006 census, its population was 103, in 32 families.

References 

Populated places in Nehbandan County